Neophygas microcephalus is a species of beetle in the family Carabidae, the only species in the genus Neophygas.

References

Harpalinae